Juggler's Three is an Australian play by David Williamson. It was based on the breakup of his first marriage, when he left his pregnant wife for a woman who left her husband.

Background
The play was commissioned by John Sumner of the Melbourne Theatre Company in mid 1971. Williamson submitted a storyline called Return from Vietname about a conscript, Graham, who discovers his wife, Karen, has left him for an economist, Neville. The play was originally titled Third World Blues but the MTC requested this be changed to Juggler's Three. The play underwent many revisions, and at one stage included sequences set in Vietnam.

The first production was very well reviewed and later transferred from Russell St Theatre to Harry M. Miller's Melbourne Playbox Theatre, which was rare for Australian plays at the time

Williamson later called the play "a hysterical and unresearched piece of melodramatical nonsense."

Third World Blues
Williamson later reworked the play again in 1996 as Third World Blues. This was done at the behest of Wayne Harrison, the director, who was an admirer of the original play. There had been a well publicised conflict between Harrison and Williamson over the staging of Heretic but they reunited for this play.

Williamson rewrote the play after researching by talking to Vietnam veterans and counsellors saying "I slowly started to realise just how traumatic war and combat is for most participants." He also made key structural changes saying "the original was virtually in farce form - there was something like 39 entrances and exits. It's down to 19 now, which structurally makes it half as farcical as before."

References

Notes
Brian Kiernan, David Williamson: A Writer's Career, Currency Press, 1996

1972 plays
1996 plays
Plays by David Williamson